The Cook Islands Party is a nationalist political party in the Cook Islands.  It was the first political party founded in the Cook Islands, and one of the two major parties of the islands' politics since 1965.

From 1999 until 2005 it sometimes participated in coalition governments. In the 2006 elections, it came runner-up and largest opposition party in the islands. The party won both the 2010 and 2014 elections and currently forms the government. As a result of the 2018 elections, it is the second largest party in the Cook Islands Parliament. The leader of the party is the Prime Minister Mark Brown.

History

The Cook Islands Party was established on 15 June 1964 by Albert Henry, a former leader of the Cook Islands Progressive Association, who had agitated for greater self-rule in the 1940s.  The party was founded on a platform of economic development, maintaining ties with New Zealand, the protection of traditional Cook Islands culture and increased recognition of traditional titles.  Within a month of foundation, the party had gained over 2,000 members on Rarotonga.

Prior to independence, the party campaigned for the residential qualification for candidates to the Legislative Assembly to be reduced, in order to allow Henry to stand.  They were unsuccessful, and as a result Henry was replaced at the 1965 elections by his sister, Marguerite Story.  The party won a strong majority of 14 seats, which they used to amend the constitution to reduce the residency requirement.  Following the passage of the necessary legislation by the New Zealand Parliament, Story resigned.  Henry was elected in the subsequent by-election, and became the first Prime Minister of the Cook Islands.

The party dominated Islands politics for the next decade, but lost power at the 1978 elections after it was discovered to have engaged in widespread electoral fraud.  Albert Henry resigned as party leader, and was replaced by his cousin Geoffrey Henry.  He was subsequently convicted of conspiracy and misuse of public money and stripped of his knighthood.

The party spent the next decade in opposition, then held power again between 1989 and 1999.  From 1999 until 2005 it sometimes participated in coalition governments. It won 10 seats in the 1999 elections and 9 seats in the 2004 elections. In 2006 it replaced its long-time leader, Geoffrey Henry, with Henry Puna, but Puna was defeated in the parliamentary elections several months later along with the deputy leader.  While he remained the party's leader, the Parliamentary Leader of the Opposition was Tom Marsters.

At the  26 September 2006 elections, the party won 45.3% of the popular vote and 7 out of 24 seats, making it is the largest opposition party.

In July 2010 following a dispute about candidate selection, Avatiu/Ruatonga MP Albert (Peto) Nicholas left the party and founded the Party Tumu.  The breakaway party attracted the support of influential CIP backer Tupui Ariki Henry, son of CIP founder and former Prime Minister Albert Henry.

CIP won the 2010 and 2014 elections, leading to two terms as Prime Minister for Henry Puna. The 2018 election resulted in a hung parliament.

Electoral performance

Legislative Assembly

Leaders

 Albert Henry (1964–1979)
 Geoffrey Henry (1979–2006)
 Henry Puna (2006–2020)
 Mark Brown (2020-current)

References

Further reading

External links
 Official website

Nationalist parties in Oceania
Political parties in the Cook Islands
Main
Political parties established in 1964
1964 establishments in the Cook Islands